Mkalles ( translit. al-Mkalles) is a town in the Matn District of the Mount Lebanon Governorate, Lebanon. Mkalles is administered by Mansourieh municipality.

References and footnotes

External links
Mansouriyeh - Mkalles - Daychouniyeh,   Localiban

Populated places in the Matn District